Maha Egodage Jayalal Rohana Perera (1 November 1964 – 11 February 2021), known as Jayalal Rohana, was an Sri Lankan actor who worked in Sri Lankan cinema, theatre and television. Considered a versatile figure in Sri Lankan entertainment, Rohana was also a writer, makeup artist, radio playwright and drama teacher who taught theatre to students as a freelance dramatist in Sri Lanka.

Personal life 
Rohana was born on 1 November 1964 in Colombo. He says that his father was the Treasurer of the Communist Party in Kotte. He studied at Ananda Sastralaya, Kotte and graduated with a Bachelor of Arts from the University of Peradeniya (External) in 2007, and also earned a Master's degree in Drama and Theater from the University of Kelaniya in 2009.

Rohana was married to Menaka Shriyani, and had a son and a daughter. He was left in critical condition in 2006, when he was hit by a train, and later survived a bomb blast that occurred near Maradana Railway Station.

Rohana was hospitalized again in December 2018 after suffering a heart attack. Rumours that he died at Ragama Hospital were refuted when Rohana posted a video on social media, confirming that he was alive. He died on 11 February 2021 from another heart attack at the Colombo North Teaching Hospital, Ragama. He was 56 years old. After his funeral, he was cremated at the Borella cemetery on 14 February.

Career
In 1976 at the age of 13, Rohanaplayd a role in Muhudu Giya directed by Soma Perera in the All Island Inter-school Drama Competition that he says. He has associated few renowned directors in Sinhala drama, like Simon Navagattegama and Sugathapala de Silva. He acted in Navagattegama's play Named Gangawak Sapaththukabalak Saha Maranayak.  In 1982 he attended an OCIC diploma course conducted by Fr. Ernest Poruthota. Then he experienced  short time theatre workshop  under Prof. Rudy Corrence from Belgium and A. G. Gunawardena at Goethe institute. In 1986 he performed in the stage play Hitler produced by Douglas Siriwardena.

He entered the television drama in 1986 and acted in many single episode dramas. For his play Loka in 1992, Jayalal received awards for Script and Best Actor at National Theater Awards. His major breakthrough in television came through the role "Muthumina" in serial Isuru Yogaya directed by Susiran de Silva. The serial was telecast on Rupavahini at 8.30 pm every Sunday. For the role, he also won the Sumathi Best Teledrama Actor Award at 2006 Sumathi Awards.

His maiden cinema acting came through 1995 film Ayoma, directed by Parakrama Niriella. Then he acted in few films such as Nimnayaka Hudakalawa, Tikiri Suwanda and Sinhawalokanaya. He also worked as a frequent resource personality in the television educational programs Doramadalawa and Television Iskole telecast by ITN. He has been worked as a resource person for drama and theatre at the University of Moratuwa and has been done guest lecturers at several universities.

In 2019, he created a music video in London, which is based on the ICC Cricket World Cup final between England and New Zealand. Apart from the acting awards, he won several awards in the fields of stage set design, stage design, composition, costume design, stage management and drama production.

Selected stage dramas
 Gangawak
 Garu Katanayakathumani (2019)
 Gondola (2014)
 Hankithi Dahathuna
 Hitler
 Invisible Wales (1992)
 Juriya
 Leeta (2011)
 Loka (1987)
 Kalu Saha Sudu
 Kelani Palama 
 MacBeth
 Math Ekka Natanna
 Padadaya
 Pandukabhaya
 Sakvithi Mola (2003)
 Sapaththukabalak Saha Maranayak
 Senehebara Dolly
 Sikura
 Socrates 
 Suba Saha Yasa
 Ukdandu Ginna
 Uththamavi
 Varna
 Veniciye Welenda
 Vikal Samayama
 Yakshagamanaya

Publications 
 Sabe Viduli Vilakkuva (1997)
 Saba Muhune Ves Muhuna '(2000)
 Handa Veduma (2007)
 Ves Muhunada Saba Muhunada '(2016)

Selected television serials
 Ahasata Thawa Aadarei
 Boralu Paara
 Deweni Gamana 
 Gajamuthu
 Ihirunu Kiri
 Isuru Yogaya
 Ekata Gatuma
 Mahathala Hatana 
 Mangala Thagga Deveni Gamana
 Minissu
 Nattukkarayo
 Nil Ahasa Oba
 Nirsathwayo
 Rathi Virathi 
 Ridi Duvili
 Salmal Landa
 Sandagala Thenna
 Sara

Filmography

References

External links
 Official YouTube channel
 Jayalal Rohana speaks about Mega tele-illness
 Chat with Jayalal
 Pushpa Wijesinghe’s ‘Sita Addara’ launched
 Heshala - Yoshitha enter wed lock
 මම දැන් සුව වෙමින් ඉන්නේ
 Sharing the Shakespearean flame
 Jayalal Rohana talks about women
 අසත්‍ය ප්‍රචාරයන්ට නොරැවටෙන්න – ජයලාල් රෝහණ

Sri Lankan dramatists and playwrights
Sri Lankan non-fiction writers
Sri Lankan radio writers
Make-up artists
1964 births
2021 deaths
Alumni of Ananda Sastralaya, Kotte
Sri Lankan male film actors
Sinhalese male actors
20th-century Sri Lankan male actors
Sri Lankan male stage actors
21st-century Sri Lankan male actors
20th-century dramatists and playwrights
20th-century non-fiction writers
20th-century Sri Lankan writers
20th-century male writers
21st-century dramatists and playwrights
21st-century non-fiction writers
21st-century Sri Lankan writers
21st-century male writers
Sri Lankan male writers
People from Colombo
Male non-fiction writers